The Masonic Temple in Shreveport, Louisiana is a historic building located at 1805 Creswell Avenue in Shreveport, Louisiana. Built in 1937 in Moderne style, it is a two-story brick building designed by architect Theodore Flaxman, who indicated that he was strongly influenced by the curvilinear buildings of European modernist Erich Mendelsohn.

The building was a contributing property of Highland Historic District since its creation in 1987, and was subsequently enlisted as an individual property on the National Register of Historic Places in 1991.

See also
National Register of Historic Places listings in Caddo Parish, Louisiana

References

Masonic buildings completed in 1937
Buildings and structures in Shreveport, Louisiana
Masonic buildings in Louisiana
Clubhouses on the National Register of Historic Places in Louisiana
National Register of Historic Places in Caddo Parish, Louisiana
1937 establishments in Louisiana